The Snou Strait is a stretch of water which separates Chirpoy from Brat Chirpoev. The channel is littered with offshore rocks and islets. It was named after Henry James Snow FRGS (1848-1915), an Englishman who hunted in and charted the Kuril Islands between 1873 and 1896.

Chyornie Bratya
Straits of the Kuril Islands